Abdul Matin Chowdhury (1 May 1921 – 24 June 1981) was a Bangladeshi academic and physicist. He served as the 14th Vice-chancellor of the University of Dhaka.

Education

Chowdhury passed entrance examination from Arunchandra High School in Noakhali District in 1937 and intermediate from Dhaka Intermediate College in 1939. He received his bachelor's and master's degrees in physics from the University of Dhaka. He obtained Ph.D. in atmospheric physics from University of Chicago in 1949. He completed Ph.D. for the second time in 1961.

Career
Chowdhury started his career as a meteorologist in the Pakistan Meteorology Department. He then joined as a reader in the Physics Department in University of Dhaka in 1950. He went on to become a professor in 1962 and the head of the Department during 1962–1967. He served as a member of the Pakistan Atomic Energy Commission during 1967–1970, Chief Scientist of the Ministry of Defence and the President's Scientific Advisor during 1970–1971.

Chowdhury was a member of the selection committee for the Nobel Prize in Physics for Asian Region.

In 1973, Chowdhury was appointed vice-chancellor of Dhaka University where he served until 1975.

Personal life
Chowdhury was married to Razia Matin (1925–2012).

Gallery

References

1921 births
1981 deaths
Bangladeshi physicists
Dhaka College alumni
University of Dhaka alumni
University of Chicago alumni
Academic staff of the University of Dhaka
Vice-Chancellors of the University of Dhaka
People from Lakshmipur District
Bangladesh Krishak Sramik Awami League central committee members